Kroeker is a surname. Notable people with the surname include:

Allan Kroeker (born 1951), Canadian film and television director, cinematographer, screenwriter, film editor and producer
Joel Kroeker, Canadian singer-songwriter
Kendell Kroeker, American politician
Tim Kroeker (born 1971), Canadian athlete

See also
Kroeger

Russian Mennonite surnames